Diego Álvarez and Juan-Martín Aranguren were the defending champions but decided not to participate.
Gero Kretschmer and Alex Satschko won in the final 6–3, 4–6, [11–9], against Philipp Oswald and Martin Slanar.

Seeds

Draw

Draw

External links
 Main Draw

IPP Trophy - Doubles
Geneva Open Challenger